HDC Group is a large Korean chaebol (conglomerate). It is active in a wide array of business fields including property, petrochemicals, retail, leisure, sports, and finance. The current chairman of HDC Group is Chung Mong-Gyu.

History
Hyundai Development Company was created in 1986 through the merger between Halla Construction and Korea City Development, two construction and development affiliates under Hyundai Group. In 1999, as part of a wider restructuring of Hyundai Group, Hyundai Development Company was spin off from Hyundai Group. Hyundai Development Group changed its name to HDC Group in 2018, following the adoption of a holding company structure.

Affiliates

References

External links 
 Official Website